The Continental Basketball Association Rookie of the Year was an annual award given to the best rookie(s) of the regular season of the CBA. The award was given to players on their first CBA season and with no prior professional experience.

History
The award was established in 1957, when the league was operating under the name Eastern Professional Basketball League. The first winner was Dick Gaines, from Seton Hall. In 1970 the league changed its name, becoming the Eastern Basketball Association. In 1975–76, for the first time in CBA history, the award was shared by two players: Mo Rivers (from NC State) and Walter Luckett (from Ohio). In 1977 a new award, the Newcomer of the Year, was created: while the Rookie of the Year was given to players on their first season with no experience in professional leagues, the Newcomer of the Year was given to players who already had professional experience. In 1996–97 the award was shared by Bernard Hopkins (from VCU) and Jason Sasser (from Texas Tech): Sasser was also called up in the NBA by the San Antonio Spurs. In 2001–02 Rookie of the Year Kenny Inge had started the 2001-02 season with BC Žalgiris in Lithuania, and joined the Rockford Lightning of the CBA on December 20, 2001. Only two players won the Rookie of the Year award and the Player of the Year award during their career: Julius McCoy (Rookie of the Year in 1959, Player of the Year in 1966) and Ken Wilburn (Rookie of the Year in 1967, Player of the Year in 1968 and 1974).

Key

Table

References

External links
EPBL/EBA/CBA Superlatives
Eastern Basketball Association Rosters

New
American basketball trophies and awards
Lists of basketball players in the United States